Carlos Emilio Tarazona (born August 14, 1965) is a retired male long-distance runner from Venezuela. He competed for his native South American country at two consecutive Summer Olympics, starting in 1996. Tarazona set his personal best in the men's marathon on April 30, 2000 in Cleveland, United States, clocking 2:11.25.

Achievements

References

sports-reference

1966 births
Living people
Venezuelan male marathon runners
Athletes (track and field) at the 1995 Pan American Games
Athletes (track and field) at the 1996 Summer Olympics
Athletes (track and field) at the 2000 Summer Olympics
Olympic athletes of Venezuela
Pan American Games competitors for Venezuela
20th-century Venezuelan people
21st-century Venezuelan people